Alejandro Giró (born 6 June 1970) is an Argentine biathlete. He competed in the 20 km individual event at the 1988 Winter Olympics.

References

1970 births
Living people
Argentine male biathletes
Olympic biathletes of Argentina
Biathletes at the 1988 Winter Olympics
Place of birth missing (living people)